The German designations of foreign firearms in World War II is a list of known foreign firearms and equipment compiled by the German armed forces before World War II.

Purpose
The purpose of these lists are threefold:
 Provide a list of German designations for foreign firearms.
 Correlate German weapons designations with their associated wiki pages.
 Provide a reference for captured foreign firearms in German service during WWII.

Background
Before the war began the German armed forces Heereswaffenamt compiled a list of known foreign equipment and assigned a unique number to each weapon. These weapons were called Fremdgerät or Beutegerät ("foreign device" or "captured device") and their technical details were recorded in a fourteen-volume set that was periodically updated. The Germans also captured large amounts of foreign equipment during WWII (for example, over 11 million rifles by the end of 1944) that they tested and cataloged using the same system. The Germans sometimes referred to these weapons as Kriegsbeute ("war booty") and the Fremdgerät numbers are sometimes referred to as Beute Nummers ("booty numbers").

The format for these designations follow this pattern.  The German designation of the type of firearm, model/year number or unique identification number and lastly its country code.  In the first example there's a carbine and it has been assigned a unique identification number and it is French.  In the second example there's a Pistol with a model/year designation and it is Austrian.  In practice common model designations don't always share the same ID numbers.  Because a Mauser model 98 could be produced in different countries, have different calibers and have a different model/year or unique identification number for each country.  Also while a Mauser model 98 from different countries may be able to fire the same ammunition that doesn't mean their parts are compatible or interchangeable.  Lastly unique numbers with / mean the weapon is a sub-variant.  For a list of German military terms see Glossary of German military terms.

Country designations

Austria

Belgium

Czechoslovakia

Denmark

France

Greece

Netherlands

Hungary

Italy

Norway

Poland

Soviet Union

United Kingdom/British Empire

United States

Yugoslavia

See also
 German designations of foreign artillery in World War II
 Specifications for World War II infantry weapons
 List of secondary and special-issue World War II infantry weapons
 Lists of World War II military equipment
 List of World War II weapons
 List of prototype World War II infantry weapons
 World War II
 Allies of World War II
 Axis powers
 Neutral powers during World War II

Notes

Bibliography
 Hogg, Ian (2000).  Military small arms of the 20th century. Weeks, John. Iola, WI: Krause Publications. 
 Chamberlain, Peter (1975). Allied pistols, rifles and grenades. Gander, Terry. New York: Arco. 
 Chamberlain, Peter (1975). Axis pistols, rifles, and grenades. Gander, Terry,. New York: Arco Pub. Co. 
 Chamberlain, Peter (1974). Machine Guns. Gander, Terry,. New York: Arco Pub. Co.

External links
 http://7.62x54r.net/Forums/index.php?topic=12239.0;wap2
 http://forums.gunboards.com/archive/index.php/t-132317.html
 http://www.gunsopedia.com/List_of_World_War_II_German_firearms

Designations of foreign firearms

World War II
German designations